Terry Darlington is the author of three best-selling books Narrow Dog to Carcassonne (2004), Narrow Dog to  Indian River (2006) and Narrow Dog to Wigan Pier (2013). These books, which humorously (and frequently poetically) describe his narrowboat travels with his wife Monica and pet whippet Jim, have sold over a million copies to date.

Darlington was brought up in Pembroke Dock, in Wales. He gained a State Scholarship to Oxford, where he obtained a degree in English. He worked for Lever Brothers for eight years before moving to Stone, teaching at the Stoke on Trent College of Technology. Although he wished to be a poet, he "had three kids" and instead in 1976 he and his wife Monica founded a market research company, Research Associates. He was a founder member of  the Stone Master Marathoners running club. Having kept a diary of his narrowboat voyage to Carcassonne, he studied creative writing before eventually producing his first book.

In 2009 the Darlington's narrow boat, Phyllis May, was destroyed by fire while moored in the Canal Cruising Company's boatyard in Crown Street, Stone. The fire, which had started in a nearby boat, spread to an adjacent one and then to the Phyllis May, which was gutted from bow to stern.
It was replaced by Phyllis May II.

Narrow Dog to Carcassonne 
On their retirement, and against the advice of many, Terry and Monica Darlington decided to sail their canal narrowboat across the English Channel from Dover to Calais. Entering the French canal system, they went north to Belgium and then south towards the Mediterranean, via the Burgundy canal and the Saône and Rhône rivers. They then took the Phyllis May  via Sète and the Étang de Thau to Carcassonne, on the Canal du Midi. Accompanying them on the voyage was their pet whippet Jim – the "narrow dog" of the book's title.

Ths very successful book received glowing reviews from (inter alia), the Sunday Telegraph, the "Good Book Guide", Joanna Lumley, "Canal & Riverboat", The Guardian, and "The Whippet".

Narrow Dog to Indian River 
Inspired by the success of his first book, the Darlingtons navigated the US Intracoastal Waterway from Norfolk, Virginia to the Gulf of Mexico.

Narrow Dog to Wigan Pier 
Darlington's third book is about the loss of the Phyllis May in a fire, and two summers spent exploring the northern canals of England in the boat's replacement, Phyllis May II, (which was built at Longport Wharf in Stoke on Trent). Compared to the previous two books, this third volume of the trilogy has rather more autobiographical material, covering Darlington's market research business, and the Stone Master Marathoner running club that he founded for the "more elderly athlete".

References 

People associated with canals
Welsh writers
Living people
People from Pembroke Dock
Year of birth missing (living people)